The EVRICUP is a European Veteran event of Roller Hockey disputed by club Teams. In each edition there are tournaments: one for players with more than 35 years (since 2003) and one for players with more than 50 years (since 2009).
The event is organized by IEC, and is held every all years.

EVRICup +35

Number of EVRICUP +35 by Team

Number of EVRICUP +35 by Country

EVRICup +50

Number of EVRICUP +50 by Team

Number of EVRICUP +50 by Country

Roller hockey competitions